Sande Church may refer to:

 Sande Church (Gaular), a church in Sunnfjord municipality in Vestland county, Norway
 Sande Church (Sunnmøre), a church in Sande municipality in Møre og Romsdal county, Norway
 Sande Church, a church in Sande, Vestfold, in Vestfold og Telemark county, Norway

See also
 Sand Church (disambiguation), a list of similarly-named churches
 Sanda Church, Gotland, Sweden